Marufa Akter (born 1 January 2005) is a Bangladeshi cricketer who plays for the Bangladesh cricket team as a right-handed batter and a right-arm medium bowler.

Career
In November 2022, she was selected in Bangladesh national squad for the New Zealand tour. She made her WT20I on 4 December 2022 and made her WODI on 11 December 2022.

In December 2022, Marufa was selected for Bangladesh's under-19 squad for the 2023 ICC Under-19 Women's T20 World Cup.

In January 2023, she was named in Bangladesh's squad for the 2023 ICC Women's T20 World Cup.

References

External links
 

2005 births
Living people
People from Nilphamari District
Bangladeshi women cricketers
Bangladesh women Twenty20 International cricketers
Pakistan women One Day International cricketers